Fox Filipino was a Philippine pay television channel focused on Philippine-produced programming from GMA Network, TV5 and Sari-Sari Channel as well as Filipino movies from GMA Pictures, entries from the Cinemalaya Philippine Independent Film Festival, selected Asian and Hollywood movies, and selected foreign programming dubbed in Tagalog language.

After 8 years of broadcasting, Fox Networks Group announced that Fox Filipino would cease broadcast on July 7, 2020, as GMA and TV5 archived content were moved to its digital television channel, Heart of Asia, Pinoy Hits, and Cignal-run satellite network, One Screen, respectively. Fox Filipino's channel space were later replaced by ABS-CBN/Creative Programs, Inc.-owned Jeepney TV on other cable and satellite platforms, including Cignal.

Final Programming

See also
 Jeepney TV
 Pinoy Hits
 Heart of Asia Channel

References

External links
 

Philippines
GMA Network (company) channels
Television channels and stations established in 2012
Television channels and stations disestablished in 2020
Television networks in the Philippines
Filipino-language television stations
Defunct television networks in the Philippines
TV5 Network channels
Classic television networks